The Commemorative Medal of the 1940–45 War was a military decoration of Belgium. It was established by royal decree of the Prince Regent on 16 February 1945 to recognise Belgian servicemen and women who served during World War II.  It was also awarded to members of the Belgian Resistance and members of Belgium's Merchant Navy on the side of the Allies. Later decrees allowed for its award to foreign recipients of the Belgian Croix de Guerre.

Award description

Insignia
The Commemorative Medal of the War 1940–1945 was a 38mm in diameter circular bronze medal, the obverse bore a large V for Victory sign with a relief roaring lion in the V, at lower left was the relief year "1940", at lower right the relief year "1945". A 3mm wide laurel wreath encircled the entire medal on both the obverse and reverse.

The medal was suspended by a ring through a lateral suspension loop from a 37mm wide yellow silk moiré ribbon with 8mm wide edge stripes composed of 2mm wide stripes of yellow, black, white and black, the yellow being closest to the edges.

Ribbon devices
Many ribbon devices are allowed for wear:
crossed sabres denoting combat service in the 1940 campaign or service in the armed resistance,
crossed anchors denoting naval combat service,
crossed lightning flashes denoting service in intelligence,
a small lion denoting a mention in dispatches,
a red enamelled cross denoting a combat wound,
bronze bars denoting years as a POW,
a star denoting colonial troops,
a crown denoting a volunteer,
multiple campaign clasps (some straight, some elliptical):
Straight clasps:
Ardennes
Ardennes Belges
Atlantique Nord
Bataille D'Angelterre
Battaille de Belgique 1940
Beauquesne
Belgique
Campagne D'Allemagne
Campagne De Hollande
Canal Albert
Canal Albert-Kanne
Canal De Terneuzen
Canal de Wessem
Dieppe
Emden
Escaut
Flandres 1940
Frontiere
Italie
Knesselare
La Dendre 1940
La Gette
La Lys 1940
Liege 1940
Manche
Namur 1940
Nevele
Normandie
Oldenburg
Ronsele
Vinkt
Walcheren
Winterbeek
Yougoslavie
Zelzate
Zwijndrecht
Elliptical clasps:
Allemagne 1944–1945
France 1944
Pays-Bas 1944–1945
Tchecoslovaquie 1945
Ardennes 1944–1945

Notable recipients (partial list)
The individuals listed below were awarded the Commemorative Medal of the War 1940–1945:
Lieutenant General Baron Charles de Cumont
Lieutenant General Albert Baron Crahay
Cavalry Lieutenant General Marcel Jooris
Lieutenant General Roger Dewandre
Lieutenant General Ernest Engelen
Lieutenant General Sir Louis Teysen
Lieutenant General Constant Weyns
Police Lieutenant General August Van Wanzeele
Aviator Lieutenant General Armand Crekillie
Major General Maurice Jacmart
Divisional Admiral Léon Lurquin
Aviator Vice Admiral Sir André Schlim
Cavalry Major General Jules François Gaston Everaert
Lieutenant General Jean-Baptiste Piron
Lieutenant General Jules Joseph Pire
Cavalry Lieutenant General Sir Maximilien de Neve de Roden
Lieutenant General Alphonse Verstraete
Major General Baron Georges Danloy
Lieutenant General Baron Raoul de Hennin de Boussu-Walcourt
Lieutenant General Joseph Leroy
Cavalry Lieutenant General Jules De Boeck
François Ernest Samray
Lieutenant General Fernand Vanderhaeghen
Lieutenant General Robert Oor
Lieutenant General Libert Elie Thomas
Lieutenant General Léon Bievez
Cavalry Major General Baron Beaudoin de Maere d'Aertrycke
Major General Lucien Van Hoof
Major General Jean Buysse
Major General Paul Jacques
Commodore Georges Timmermans
Aviator Major General Norbert Leboutte
Police Lieutenant General Louis Joseph Leroy
Police Lieutenant General Oscar-Eugène Dethise
Chaplain General Louis Kerremans
Count Pierre Harmel
Lucienne Marie Adans

See also

 List of Orders, Decorations and Medals of the Kingdom of Belgium
 Belgian order of precedence (decorations and medals)

References

Other sources
 Quinot H., 1950, Recueil illustré des décorations belges et congolaises, 4e Edition. (Hasselt)
 Cornet R., 1982, Recueil des dispositions légales et réglementaires régissant les ordres nationaux belges. 2e Ed. N.pl.,  (Brussels)
 Borné A.C., 1985, Distinctions honorifiques de la Belgique, 1830–1985 (Brussels)
 WINKLER PRINS:  Herinneringsmedaille van de oorlog 1940–1945.

External links
 https://web.archive.org/web/20091128084301/http://users.skynet.be/hendrik/nl/B2-N-Comm.html
Bibliothèque royale de Belgique (In French)
Les Ordres Nationaux Belges (In French)
ARS MORIENDI Notables from Belgian history (In French and Dutch)

1945 establishments in Belgium
Military awards and decorations of Belgium
Awards established in 1945